Robert Francis Garrow Sr. (March 4, 1936 – September 11, 1978) was an American serial rapist and later spree killer who was active in New York in the early 1970s. After committing several rapes, Garrow went on an 18-day killing spree and stabbed four people to death before being apprehended. His criminal trial, known as the Buried Bodies Case, became an important case in legal ethics after his attorneys refused to disclose the location of the bodies of two of his victims, citing attorney–client privilege. Garrow was later shot dead while escaping from prison in 1978.

Early life
Robert Garrow Jr. was born in Dannemora, New York, to French-Canadian parents Robert Omer Garrow and his wife, Margaret, who were poor farmers. His oldest sister would later become the mother of Suzanne Basso. Garrow later claimed his parents were severe, violent disciplinarians who regularly physically abused their children with whatever was handy, even bricks. His accounts have been repeated by his siblings.

The police were called several times throughout the years to break up violent fights between Garrow and his alcoholic father. After a particularly brutal episode when Garrow was 15, he was sent to a farm to work. He later reported a long history of sexual dysfunction and paraphilias, committed several acts of bestiality with the farm animals he worked with throughout childhood and adolescence, and would often masturbate with milking machines. 

Garrow joined the United States Air Force upon his release, but was court-martialed a year later for stealing money from a superior officer and spent six months in a military prison in Florida.

Criminal history

Garrow returned to New York in 1957, where he married and fathered a son. His life did not improve, however; he was fired from a series of menial jobs, including from a fast food restaurant he burglarized, and was involved in an abusive relationship with a man he later described as a sadist. Garrow was arrested for rape in 1961 and spent seven years in prison. Soon after he was released, he committed a series of rapes, and many of his victims were children. He was arrested for the rape of two prepubescent girls, but jumped bail and became a fugitive.

In July 1973, Garrow murdered four people, including a young woman whom he kidnapped and repeatedly raped before killing, and a high school-aged camper in the Adirondacks a few days later. Three witnesses escaped and sought police, spurring a twelve-day statewide manhunt that was, at the time, the largest in New York State history. Road blocks were set up at intersections throughout Adirondack Park requiring motorists to open vehicle trunks for law enforcement to thoroughly search. Motorists were warned not to stop for anyone on foot near the roads for fear that Garrow might have tried to pose as a hitchhiker. He survived, alleging that he was partially paralyzed.

Garrow was treated at CVPH Medical Center in Plattsburgh, New York, where doctors disbelieved his claims of paralysis. He sued the State of New York for $10 million, alleging that the state's doctors had been negligent in treating the gunshot wound, leading to his alleged paralysis. He was moved to a medium security prison in exchange for dropping the lawsuit, and was later found to be feigning his paralysis. Garrow pleaded not guilty by reason of insanity, but the jury rejected his plea and found him guilty of second-degree murder, sentencing him to a term of 25 years to life in prison. Garrow began his sentence at Clinton Correctional Facility (maximum security) in Dannemora on July 2, 1974. Due to his alleged paralysis, however, he repeatedly requested transfer to the Elderly and Handicapped Unit (minimum security) within the medium-security Fishkill Correctional Facility. In September, 1977, a death threat against Garrow prompted his transfer to Auburn Correctional Facility (maximum security). It was not until early 1978 that he was transferred back to Fishkill.

A grand jury indicted one of Garrow's lawyers – Francis Belge, with whom he had shared the location of two victims' bodies – for violating §§ 4200(1) and 4143 of the New York Public Health Law: the first such section required that a decent burial be accorded the dead, while the second required "anyone knowing of the death of a person without medical attendance, to report the same to proper authorities. The trial court granted the attorneys' motion to dismiss the indictment on the grounds that the communications between Garrow and Belge as to the whereabouts of the bodies were protected by the attorney–client privilege, and "in the interests of justice." As to the privilege, the court held that Belge's professional duties prohibited him from revealing information that would incriminate his client, reasoning that the Fifth Amendment rights of criminal defendants against self-incrimination would be circumvented if "compulsory disclosure can be exacted through his attorney." However, the court noted that if Belge had been charged with obstruction of justice "under a proper statute," rather than a rarely applied "pseudo-criminal statute," the requisite balancing of the accused's Fifth Amendment rights against the rights of society to punish culpable behavior would have rendered the court's decision much more difficult.

Escape and death
Landing himself in a less secure facility due to his false claims of paralysis, Garrow escaped from Fishkill on September 8, 1978. He was in possession of a .32 caliber pistol he had obtained from his son, who concealed the weapon inside a bucket of chicken he brought to his father during a visit. Garrow then spurred another search after he was discovered missing from his cell. The false claims about his paralysis kept the guards unsuspecting, as he scaled a  fence to escape the prison grounds. He waited in a nearby wooded area, remaining concealed in the brush and leaves until the search widened and he could continue running. However, Garrow was spotted by guards a few days later, a few hundred yards away from the prison walls. Garrow shot at his pursuers, wounding Correction Officer Dominic Arena in the leg, but was shot three times and killed by Correction Officer Frank Lago.

Murder victims
 July 11: Alicia Hauck, 16
 July 20: Daniel Porter, 23
 July 20: Susan Petz, 20
 July 29: Philip Domblewski, 18

Footnotes

1936 births
1978 deaths
American rapists
Criminals from New York (state)
People from Clinton County, New York
American people who died in prison custody
Prisoners who died in New York (state) detention
Deaths by firearm in New York (state)
American people convicted of murder
People convicted of murder by New York (state)
People shot dead by law enforcement officers in the United States
American murderers of children
American escapees
Escapees from New York (state) detention
American spree killers
United States Air Force airmen
United States Air Force personnel who were court-martialed
American people of French-Canadian descent